Israelis in the United Kingdom are citizens or residents of the United Kingdom who were originally from Israel or are of Israeli descent.

Demographics
In 2001 Israel was the 68th most common birthplace for British residents; some 11,892 people born in Israel lived in the UK. It is unknown how many people born in the UK are of Israeli descent, as this was not listed as a separate ethnic group in the 2001 Census. The majority of Israelis in the UK live in London and, in particular, the densely populated Jewish area of Golders Green. The vast majority of Israeli Britons are Jewish. The most common languages amongst the Israeli British community are Hebrew, Arabic and British English.

Contemporary issues
Some Israeli-Jewish expatriates in Europe complain that they feel excluded from the rest of the Jewish community. Only 2% of expats in Britain and France who responded to a 2008 survey said that they feel part of the local Jewish community.  Despite many Israelis claiming not to feel connected to other Jewish groups in the country, around 33% of those interviewed said they felt more attached to their Jewish identity rather than their Israeli identity, with 11% saying they identified less as Jews. A survey by JTA reported that the Israeli community in the UK had little involvement in the local Jewish community, though Israeli expats often chose to live in predominantly Jewish areas. Israelis in the UK often complain of being discouraged by the perceived "frosty" attitude of British Jews towards them, but at the same time many Israelis in Britain are indifferent to the local Jewish community and reluctant to become part of it.

Media
Alondon is London's main Hebrew-language magazine that caters primarily to the British Israeli community.

Notable people

One of the most notable British people of Israeli descent is Sacha Baron Cohen, an English comedian and actor whose mother came from Israel. Others include English magician Uri Geller and Scottish professional wrestler Noam Dar, both of whom were born in Israel and later moved to the UK.

In 2008, six Israelis were counted amongst the top 50 richest people in the UK, according to the Sunday Times Rich Listequal to the number of people born in the UK who made the top 50. They include Lev Leviev, Benny Steinmetz, and brothers Eddie and Saul Zakai.

See also

 British Israelism
 Israeli diaspora
 Yerida

References

External links
 The Spiroark Immigration Solutions for Israelis in the UK

 
Immigration to the United Kingdom by country of origin
Israeli diaspora in Europe